Auke Tellegen (born 1930) is a psychologist who served as a professor of psychology at the University of Minnesota from 1968 to 1999. He worked on assessment, developing the Multidimensional Personality Questionnaire and contributed to the Minnesota Multiphasic Personality Inventory.

He received his PhD in clinical psychology from the University of Minnesota in 1962 and did post-doctoral study in clinical psychology at the University of Minnesota Medical School.

Research 
Tellegen, alongside David Lykken, studied the effects that genetics had on a person's happiness.

Absorption 
Tellegen proposed the personality trait of Absorption. In 1974 he developed the Tellegen Absorption Scale (TAS) with Gilbert Atkinson, which he revised in 1982 and 1992.

Awards 
Bruno Klopfer Award, 2000
Jack Block Award, 2001
APA Award for Distinguished Contributions to Assessment Psychology, 2012

References 

20th-century American people
Living people
1930 births
Behavior geneticists
University of Minnesota faculty
University of Minnesota College of Liberal Arts alumni
American clinical psychologists